A gerb is a type of firework which produces a jet of sparks, usually lasting between 15 and 60 seconds. It is a thick-walled tube filled with pyrotechnic composition and possessing a choke, which is a narrowing in the tube. Gerbs are often referred to as 'fountains' (spark fountain).

Sometimes a small charge of black powder is added to the bottom of a gerb to make it finish with a bang: this charge is known as the 'bounce'. These are commonly used at sporting events.

Gerbs are usually measured in terms of time and height. For example, a 4×4 burns for 4 seconds at a height of 4 feet.

Eric Newby's book The Last Grain Race (chapter two: "Mountstewart") contains a 1938 reference to what appears to be the original gerb—in effect a mortar bomb fired from a mortar.

Types of fireworks